A stable belt is a striped coloured belt worn at times by the armed forces of the United Kingdom and other Commonwealth countries – and a few other countries such as Denmark, Brazil and Lebanon. The stripes identify and vary by regiment and corps. In Brazil and Lebanon they are known as  gymnastic belts.

The term "stable belt" originates from when UK cavalrymen would place the surcingle around the waist when cleaning the stables and tending to their horses. In the 1950s they spread to all branches of the armed forces, adding a splash of colour and individuality to the drab khaki working uniforms. Initially they were resisted by many senior officers, who saw them as too individualistic, but they soon became accepted throughout the UK forces – and have now spread to the forces of a number of other countries. The "gymnastic belt" of some countries now has a similar appearance and use, but the name reflects its origin from physical training equipment.

Australia
The Australian Army adopted the stable belt in the late 1970s. They were removed from service in 1995, but were reintroduced in 2017.

Brazil 

In Brazil, the gymnastic belt is one of the most traditional elements of the uniforms of the Military Firefighters Corps. It has been used with few modifications since 1887. Made of cotton and leather, earlier examples were reinforced to serve as climbing harnesses. Modern gymnastic belts are of lighter construction and only worn as a ceremonial item.

There are only two variations of the gymnastics belt:
For Officers:
The belt is red with a horizontal stripe in blue, with the buckles in silver metal. In the 1960s, the leather components were white in colour.

For Soldiers (Sergeants,  Corporals, and Privates):
The belt is red, with the buckles in gold metal.

Denmark
The Danish Army, Home Guard, and Air Force all use stable belts. The Danish Defence's close co-operation with the British Army of the Rhine in the 1950s created the interest in a similar belt, for the Guard Hussar Regiment, which was introduced in 1968. In the late 70s, it was decided to allow Stable belts for all regiments in Denmark. The design of the belt would be based on the colours of the regiment, and a colour to signify their role. To show the transition between role and regiment colours, a thin line was introduced, there is however no system with these.
Red: Combat troops
Blue: Signal troops
Gray: HMAK

The Danish armed forces have had a total of 43 different stable belts, today there are only around sixteen in use. Only the standard black stable belt is issued, other belts have to be purchased individually, so are neither regulation nor compulsory.

In use

Disbanded regiments

Lebanon
Lebanese firefighters (الدفاع المدني, i.e. "Civil Defense") use the same type of gymnastic belt as used by firefighters in Brazil.

New Zealand
The various Corps and Regiments of the New Zealand Army wear stable belts. Most corps wear patterns of belt  identical to that of their counterparts in the British Army

Corps and Regiments

Queen Alexandra's Mounted Rifles;

The QAMR belt is Black with a central Amber stripe as used by the original Queen Alexandra’s Mounted Rifles, they are also the colours of the Taranaki, where the unit’s foundations were laid in the early 1860s.
Royal New Zealand Infantry Regiment;

Personnel of the Royal New Zealand Infantry Regiment, with the exception of those serving in Territorial Force battalion groups, wear the regimental belt of the Durham Light Infantry, being rifle green with two thin red stripes. The belt was adopted as the RNZIR Corps belt in 1970. The Durham Light Infantry regimental belt was given to the 1st Battalion, Royal New Zealand Infantry Regiment when it relieved the 1st Battalion, Durham Light Infantry at Sarawak, Borneo in May 1966.

New Zealand Special Air Service;

Originates from belt worn by the British Special Air Service. It was first worn in 1965 by 1 Detachment, 1 Ranger Squadron NZSAS. The colours originate from a concept by David Stirling integrating the Oxford Blue and Cambridge Blue.

Royal New Zealand Army Logistic Regiment;

The Royal New Zealand Army Logistic Regiment Stable belt is Blue with a silver buckle displaying the Regiment Badge surrounded by the Regimental Motto "Ma Nga Hua Tu-Tangata" "By our actions we are known".

Reserve Infantry Battalions
The reserve battalions of the Royal New Zealand Infantry Regiment retain their own patterns of stable belt. In 2013 the reserve battalions were amalgamated, reducing their number from six to three. No decision has yet been made as to the future of the various battalions belts.
 

2nd (Canterbury, and Nelson-Marlborough and West Coast) Battalion;

Rifle green, as worn by the Battalions Allied Regiment, The Royal Irish Rangers. 

3rd (Auckland (Countess of Ranfurly's Own) and Northland) Battalion;

Two sets of thin Red and White stripes on a Black background, adopted in 1995. Originally the belt consisted of three even sized stripes of Red, Black and White and were based on the Regiment's colours.

4th (Otago and Southland) Battalion;

The Otago and Southland Regimental belt is that of Queen’s Own Highlanders, and is the pattern of the McKenzie tartan.

5th (Wellington West Coast and Taranaki) Battalion;

Two separate belts are worn; officers and warrant officers wear a black belt with central stripes of red, green, yellow, mauve, and red, while soldiers below the rank of warrant officer wear a black belt with central stripes of yellow, red, green, and mauve. The belts adopted in 1973 were based on the Royal Hampshire Regiment with colours stemming from the regimental colours and the colours of the lace and facings on the uniforms of the 37th (North Hampshire) Regiment of Foot and 67th (South Hampshire) Regiment.

6th (Hauraki) Battalion;

Thames blue with a gold strip in the middle, derived from the old Royal Warwickshire Regiment which in turn is derived from the old 6th Regiment of Foot. The 6th Foot were once charged with guarding the Crown Jewels in the Tower of London; hence the blue of the belt represents the Thames river and the Gold stripe, the Crown Jewels. The belt was introduced in 1975 and has a buckle in worn centre which has the Regiments badge mounted.

7th (Wellington (City of Wellington's Own) and Hawke's Bay) Battalion;

The 7th Wellington (City of Wellington’s Own) and Hawke’s Bay Battalion Group inherited the York and Lancaster Regiment stable belt. The belt is composed of maroon bands at the top and bottom (16mm wide), with a centre stripe of black (18mm wide) with a silver stripe above and gold stripe (each 6mm wide) below the centre strip. The York and Lancaster Regiment was allied to the Wellington Regiment in 1913 in recognition of the York and Lancs (65th of Foot) 19 year participation in the New Zealand Wars.

United Kingdom

A stable belt is a wide webbing belt, usually a single solid colour or horizontally striped in two or more different colours. It is worn around the waist and when worn with PCS it is worn through the trouser belt loops. In the British Army or Royal Marines, when worn with barrack dress, the belt is placed either in the belt loops of trousers or a skirt or over a jersey. In the Royal Air Force, it is worn with service working dress (No. 2 dress) either covering the top of the trousers (or skirt) and the lower part of the shirt or through the belt loops if they have been specially designed to accommodate the belt's width. Unlike the Army, it is never worn over a jersey. The original cavalry stable belts buckled at the side to avoid chafing the soldier's stomach as he bent down during stable work and also to avoid marking or catching on the horse harness, but many stable belts are now clipped at the front, sometimes behind a metal belt plate (usually bearing the badge of the regiment), although a few regiments such as the Light Infantry clip their stable belts at the front with the original two leather straps. A large number of units, however, continue to use the traditional method of securing the belt using two leather straps and metal buckles at the left-hand side.

Today, every regiment and corps of the British Army has its own stable belt, often very colourful. The Royal Navy, Royal Marines and Royal Air Force also have their own, until recently the Royal Navy rarely wore stable belts, unless working in a tri-service environment, they are now issued as a standard piece of uniform with the new Royal Navy Uniform RNPCS replacing the old No. 4s. Stable belts are worn with most styles of informal dress, but not with full dress, service dress or mess dress. Stable belts for Soldiers are purchased by individual service personnel, not issued, so are theoretically neither regulation nor compulsory but since most people own one they are effectively uniform items in the Army.

Note that these belts are shown in cross section, the stripes actually being horizontal as worn, and are actually considerably wider than shown, although the stripes are shown in correct proportion. Where belts are asymmetrical, the left-hand side of the illustration is the uppermost as worn.

Cavalry/armoured regiments (current)

Infantry regiments (current)

Corps (current)

Sub-units

Training units

Other services

Cadet units

Other organisations

Former cavalry regiments

Former Yeomanry regiments
Many of these belts are still worn by sub-units.

Former infantry regiments

Former volunteer infantry regiments
These stable belts may still be worn by sub-units.

Former corps

Former sub-units

Former training units

Former civil defence organisations

References

Sources

Materiel Regulations for The Army, Volume 3, Pamphlet No.16, Optional items of dress, Ministry of Defence, London, 1995

External links
Stable Belts
Society of the Military Horse

British military uniforms
Cavalry
British military insignia